The New Zealand owlet-nightjar (Aegotheles novazelandiae) is an extinct, comparatively large species of owlet-nightjar (family Aegothelidae) formerly endemic to the islands of New Zealand. Fossil remains (which are common in the pellets of the extinct laughing owl) indicate the species was once widespread across both the North Island and the South Island.

Description
The New Zealand owlet-nightjar was the largest species of owlet-nightjar, weighing an estimated 150–200 g. The species was also either flightless, as suggested by its small wings, or a very poor flier (the species has a strong keel). The diet probably consisted of invertebrates, as well as frogs and lizards.

Extinction
The species most likely rapidly became extinct after the Māori arrived in New Zealand, introducing Pacific rats. Their remains have never been found in association with Māori middens, and are unlikely to have been hunted due to their small size and nocturnal habits. Despite a small number of reports of small owls being found in the 19th century that may have been New Zealand owlet-nightjars, the species is thought to have become extinct around 1400 AD.

References

 Worthy, Trevor H., & Holdaway, Richard N. (2002) The Lost World of the Moa, Indiana University Press: Bloomington, 

Holocene extinctions
Aegotheles
Nightjars
Extinct birds of New Zealand
Extinct flightless birds
Birds described in 1968
Fossil taxa described in 1968
Species made extinct by human activities
Late Quaternary prehistoric birds